Occupation of Korea may refer to

the colonization of Korea by the Empire of Japan between 1910 and 1945, see Korea under Japanese rule
the occupation of the former Japanese colony Korea by the two victorious Allies of World War II Soviet Union and the USA after the surrender of Japan in 1945, see
Soviet Civil Administration
United States Army Military Government in Korea